Stenoptilia coenei is a moth of the family Pterophoridae. It is found in Terskey Alatau, Kyrgyzstan.

The wingspan is about 22 mm. The head is grey-brown and the antennae are dark brown, with some white scales. The thorax and tegulae are grey-brown, although the mesothorax is mixed whitish in the dorsal parts. The forewings are costally brown-grey and dorsally mixed with numerous white scales. The markings are dark brown. The hindwings are grey-brown and the fringes are brown-grey.

Adults have been recorded in July at an altitude of 3,000 to 3,200 meters.

References

Moths described in 2000
coenei
Moths of Asia